Timothy Nolan Gantz (23 December 1945 – 20 January 2004) was an American classical scholar and the author of Early Greek Myth: A Guide to Literary and Artistic Sources. Gantz received his Bachelor of Arts from Haverford College in 1967, and his Ph.D. in Classics from Princeton University in 1970. From 1970, he was a long-time Professor of Classics at the University of Georgia, where he directed its "Studies Abroad in Rome" program from 1985 to 2003. In 1993 he published his Early Greek Myth, which puts particular emphasis on earlier sources of the Archaic period. The book was received positively, and, according to classicist Robin Hard, "can be recommended unreservedly as a comprehensive guide to the early mythical tradition". Gantz died in Athens, Georgia, on 20 January 2004, aged 58.

References

Sources

External links
 .

1946 births
2004 deaths
University of Georgia faculty
American classical scholars